The 2009 FIBA Europe Under-20 Championship for Women was the eighth edition of the Women's European basketball championship for national under-20 teams. It was held in Gdynia, Poland, from 9 to 19 July 2009. France women's national under-20 basketball team won the tournament and became the European champions for the second time.

Participating teams

  (Runners-up, 2008 FIBA Europe Under-20 Championship for Women Division B)

  (Winners, 2008 FIBA Europe Under-20 Championship for Women Division B)

First round
In the first round, the teams were drawn into four groups of four. The first three teams from each group advance to the quarterfinal round, the last teams will play in the classification round for 13th–16th place.

Group A

Group B

Group C

Group D

Second round
In the second round, the teams play in two groups of six. The first four teams from each group advance to the quarterfinals, the other teams will play in the 9th–12th place playoffs.

Group E

Group F

Classification round for 13th–16th place

Group G

9th–12th place playoffs

9th–12th place semifinals

11th place match

9th place match

Championship playoffs

Quarterfinals

5th–8th place playoffs

Semifinals

7th place match

5th place match

3rd place match

Final

Final standings

References

2009
2009–10 in European women's basketball
International youth basketball competitions hosted by Poland
FIBA U20
July 2009 sports events in Europe